The Zimbabwean cricket team toured Kenya from 27 January to 4 February 2009. They played five One Day Internationals against Kenya.

ODI series

1st ODI

2nd ODI

3rd ODI

4th ODI

5th ODI

References

International cricket competitions in 2008–09
2009 in Kenyan cricket
Kenya
Zimbabwean cricket tours of Kenya